The Eastern Boyacá Province is a province of the Colombian Department of Boyacá. The province is formed by 8 municipalities. The Tenza Valley is located in the Eastern Boyacá Province. The province hosts the eastern belt containing rich emerald deposits.

Municipalities 
Almeida • Chivor • Guateque • Guayatá • La Capilla • Somondoco • Sutatenza • Tenza

References 

Provinces of Boyacá Department